Events from the year 1639 in Sweden

Incumbents
 Monarch – Christina

Events

 14 April – Battle of Chemnitz took place near the town of Chemnitz, in what is now eastern Germany, during the Thirty Years' War. Swedish forces under Johan Banér inflicted a crushing defeat on Rodolfo Giovanni Marazzino who commanded the Saxons and an Imperial detachment.
 Hjälmare kanal taken in to use. 
 Case of Anna von Hintzen, a noble who flees Sweden to escape arrest of the murder of her servant

Births

 5 January – Otto Wilhelm Königsmarck, military officer (died 1688) 
 Märta Berendes, courtier and diary writer (died 1717)

Deaths

References

 
Years of the 17th century in Sweden
Sweden